Eupithecia wittmeri is a moth in the family Geometridae. It is found in Saudi Arabia.

References

Moths described in 1980
wittmeri
Moths of Asia